The Jatropheae are a tribe of the subfamily Crotonoideae, under the family Euphorbiaceae. It comprises eight genera.

See also
 Taxonomy of the Euphorbiaceae

References

 
Euphorbiaceae tribes